Clarence Melville Hindson (7 October 1907 – 13 February 2002) was an Australian rules footballer who played with St Kilda in the Victorian Football League (VFL).

Hindson was captain of St Kilda for part of the 1933 VFL season, after the playing coach broke his shoulder. He didn't captain the club the following year but was in charge for the entire 1935 season.

After retiring from the VFL, Hindson played for South Bendigo.

He would later serve with the Australian Army in World War II.

References

External links
 
 

1907 births
Australian rules footballers from Victoria (Australia)
St Kilda Football Club players
South Bendigo Football Club players
Australian Army personnel of World War II
2002 deaths
Australian Army soldiers